Furnace Creek is a census-designated place (CDP) in Inyo County, California, United States. The population was 136 at the 2020 census, up from 24 at the 2010 census. Furnace Creek holds the record for the highest recorded air temperature on Earth at 134 °F (56.7 °C) on July 10, 1913. Furnace Creek also holds the record for the highest recorded natural ground surface temperature on Earth at 201 °F (93.9 °C) on July 15, 1972, and also holds some other temperature records. 

The visitor center, museum, and headquarters of the Death Valley National Park are located at Furnace Creek.

Geography and climate

Springs in the Amargosa Range created a natural oasis at Furnace Creek, which has subsequently dwindled due to diversion of this water to support the village.

Summers are extraordinarily hot and long, while winter is very warm. Furnace Creek holds the record for the most consecutive days above : 43 days, from 6 July through 17 August 1917.

Furnace Creek holds the record for the highest recorded temperature in the world, reaching  on July 10, 1913. Some meteorologists dispute the accuracy of the 1913 temperature measurement.

(Temperatures measured directly on the ground may exceed air temperatures by 50 to 90 °F (30 to 50 °C).)

History

The William Tell Coleman Borax Company established Greenland Ranch in 1883, named after the green alfalfa fields which they planted there. They established a weather station at the ranch in 1891. Greenland Ranch was renamed Furnace Creek Ranch in 1933.

The Timbisha tribe currently live at the Death Valley Indian Community reservation here.  They provided many of the artisans and builders to construct the original Fred Harvey Company resort buildings, the Indian Village, and Park Service structures. They compose the majority of residents of Furnace Creek's permanent population at the tribe's reservation. Furnace Creek was formerly the center of Death Valley mining and operations for the Pacific Coast Borax Company and the historic 20 Mule Teams hauling wagon trains of borax across the Mojave Desert.

Demographics

The 2010 United States Census reported that Furnace Creek had a population of 24. The population density was 0.8 people per square mile (0.3/km). The racial makeup was six (25.0%) White, 16 (66.7%) American Indian, and two (8.3%) from two or more races.

The Census reported that 24 people (100% of the population) lived in households. There were 15 households, out of which two (13.3%) had children under age 18, four (26.7%) were married couples living together, four (20.0%) had a female householder with no husband present. Eight households (53.3%) were made up of individuals, and three (20.0%) had someone living alone who was 65 or older. The average household size was 1.60.  There were seven families (46.7%), and the average family size was 2.29. The population consisted of two people (8.3%) under 18, two (8.3%) aged 18 to 24, five (20.8%) aged 25 to 44, nine (37.5%) aged 45 to 64, and six (25.0%) who were 65 or older. The median age was 52.0 years.

There were 15 occupied housing units at an average density of 0.6 per square mile (0.2/km), of which 11 (73.3%) were owner-occupied, and four (26.7%) were occupied by renters.

Politics

Tourist facilities
The village is surrounded by a number of National Park Service public campgrounds. The Ranch at Death Valley is located there, part of the Oasis at Death Valley, one of the park's major tourist facilities. Some lodging is closed in the summer when temperatures can exceed , but the golf course remains open; the resort established a summer tournament in 2011 called the Heatstroke Open which drew a field of 48. There is also a restaurant, café, store, and gas station in Furnace Creek village.

California Historical Landmark
Near Furnace Creek is California Historical Landmark number 442, Death Valley '49ers Gateway, assigned on October 24, 1949.  The marker is at the corner of State Route 190 and Badwater Road. 

The California Historical Landmark reads:
NO. 442 DEATH VALLEY GATEWAY - Through this natural gateway the Death Valley '49ers, more than 100 emigrants from the Middle West seeking a shortcut to gold fields of central California, entered Death Valley in December 1849. All suffered from thirst and starvation. Seeking an escape from the region, two contingents went southwest from here, while the others proceeded northwest.

See also
Geology of the Death Valley area
Places of interest in the Death Valley area
History of California through 1899
Henry Wade Exit Route a 49er
California Historical Landmarks in Inyo County

Notes

References

External links

Official Death Valley National Park website
Official Timbisha Shoshone Tribe website
Furnace Creek interactive map of local points of interest

Populated places in the Mojave Desert
Death Valley
Death Valley National Park
Census-designated places in Inyo County, California
Oases of California
Timbisha
Census-designated places in California